Rae Kushner Yeshiva High School / Yeshivat HaTichonit Beit Yosef is a four-year private Modern Orthodox yeshiva high school located in Livingston, New Jersey, United States. The school serves students living in areas ranging from Livingston, West Orange, East Brunswick, Highland Park/Edison, Staten Island, Elizabeth and Union County. The affiliated Joseph Kushner Hebrew Academy serves students through eighth grade. As of the 2013–14 school year, the school had an enrollment of 236 students.

History
The earliest predecessor to the Joseph Kushner Hebrew Academy was founded in 1942. In a merger with four Talmud Torahs in 1948, the school started its evolution into a Jewish day school. From the original seven students, the school grew to approximately 400 students in its building on Clinton Avenue, Newark. In 1987, the school became the Joseph Kushner Hebrew Academy and moved to Livingston in 1996.

The Kushner Yeshiva High School opened its doors in 2000 with 57 freshman students, a comparatively large enrollment for a new Yeshiva High School. Kushner Yeshiva High School was renamed to the Rae Kushner Yeshiva High School, in memory of the wife of Joseph Kushner, by their son Charles Kushner, one of the school's primary benefactors.

The school is situated on a  campus that features a  building includes a 20,000-volume English-Judaic library, a 220-seat Beit Midrash, a 600-seat auditorium, Holocaust Memorial Gardens, Holocaust studies center, hockey rink, and a multipurpose gymnasium.

The school houses a program of the SINAI Special Needs Institute, also known as SINAI Schools, an organization dedicated to serving the educational, psychological and emotional needs of children with special needs or complex learning disabilities. Children of below to above average intelligence with different degrees of learning disability, with a wide variety of behavioral characteristics are served, whose needs could not be addressed by traditional Jewish day school programs and curricula.

Administration
Core members of the school's administration are

 Rabbi Eliezer Rubin - Head of School, Klatt Family Rosh Hayeshiva
 Howard Plotsker - Associate Principal
 Gary Berger - Assistant Principal, Guidance and Student Services
 Jeremy Halpern and Dov Lando - co-presidents

References

External links
Rae Kushner Yeshiva High School website
National Center for Education Statistics data for Rae Kushner Yeshiva High School

1942 establishments in New Jersey
Educational institutions established in 1942
Jewish day schools in New Jersey
Livingston, New Jersey
Modern Orthodox Jewish day schools in the United States
Modern Orthodox Judaism in New Jersey
Private high schools in Essex County, New Jersey
Orthodox yeshivas in New Jersey
Zionism in the United States